The Netherlands Antilles national baseball team was a national team of the Netherlands Antilles and was controlled by the Netherlands Antillean Baseball Federation. It represented the former nation in senior-level men's international competition.

The Netherlands Antilles team was distinct from the Netherlands national baseball team.

The Netherlands Antilles were represented in twelve Baseball World Cups. Their highest finish was 7th place.

See also 
 Baseball in the Netherlands

References

Bibliography 
 

National baseball teams
National sports teams of the Netherlands Antilles
Baseball in the Caribbean